is a private university in Totsuka-ku, Yokohama, Kanagawa Prefecture, Japan. It was established in 2006 on the site of the former Yokohama Dreamland amusement park, converting the existing hotel building into classrooms and a library. It was founded by Yasuhisa Tsuzuki and is operated by his company, the Tsuzuki Integrated Educational Institution. The college's president is Nobel-prize laureate Leo Esaki.

Educational institutions established in 2006
Private universities and colleges in Japan
Universities and colleges in Yokohama
Pharmacy schools in Japan
2006 establishments in Japan